William Bevan Linger (11 May 1931 – 10 March 2020) was an Australian rules footballer who played with St Kilda in the Victorian Football League (VFL).

Notes

External links 

1931 births
Australian rules footballers from Tasmania
St Kilda Football Club players
City-South Football Club players
2020 deaths